The 2017 Kamloops Crown of Curling was held from October 20 to 23  at the Kamloops Curling Club in Kamloops, British Columbia as part of the 2017–18 World Curling Tour.

Teams 
The teams are listed as follows

Round-robin standings

Scores

Draw 1 

Galusha 5-8 Shimzu

Pewarchuk 6-5 Van Osch

Wark 2-6 Donaldson

Gyles 7-12 Olson

Slattery 7-4 Cowan

Knezivic 11-5 Mei

Draw 2 

Mei 9-4 Cowan

Pewarchuk 8-5 Gushulak

Wark 9-6 Gyles

Thompson 7-3 Knesivic

Van Osch 5-3 Shimizu

Draw 3 

Knesivic 10-3 Cowan

Galusha 6-3 Gushulak

Pewarchuk 8-2 Shimizu

Brown 7-3 Gyles

Olson 7-5 Donaldson

Slattery 4-3 Thompson

Draw 4 

Van Osch 7-5 Galusha

Wark 8-7 Olson

Thompson 6-3 Cowan

Gushulak 7-2 Shimzu

Mei 3-6 Slattery

Brown 7-0 Donaldson

Draw 5 

Donaldson 7-0 Gyles

Thompson 5-2 Mei

Brown 6-5 Wark

Gushulak 3-6 Van Osch

Kneszivic 6-4 Slattery

Tiebreaker 
 Patti Knezevic 6-4  Karla Thompson

Playoffs

References

External links

Kamloops Crown of Curling, 2017
2017 in women's curling
Sport in Kamloops
October 2017 sports events in Canada
2017 in British Columbia
Curling in British Columbia